Priyanka Shah (born 1984) is an Indian former netball player, actress and beauty pageant titleholder. She is the winner of Miss Tourism India 2007 and a finalist in Femina Miss India 2007. She is also the winner of Get Gorgeous 2005.

Early life and career
Shah's parents are Maharashtrian and Gujarati. Shah is an Engineering graduate from MIT College Pune. She is also a former captain of the India national netball team.

In pageantry she won the Miss Tourism India title in 2007.

She was supposed to make her debut through a Tamil film titled Kalla Kadhalan opposite actor Sibiraj and Kannada actor Vishal Hedge in 2008, but the film was shelved. Shah has completed a course in acting at the Kishore Namit Kumar acting school in Mumbai.

Filmography
 I Love Desi (2015) as Simran
 Server Sundaram (upcoming)

References

External links
 
 

Living people
Indian beauty pageant winners
Indian film actresses
Participants in Indian reality television series
Indian netballers
21st-century Indian actresses
Actresses in Hindi cinema
1984 births